Paduvaaralli Pandavaru is a 1978 Indian Kannada language film directed by Puttanna Kanagal. It stars Ambareesh, Ramakrishna and Jai Jagadish as the protagonists and Aarathi makes an extended special appearance in the role of a journalist. The movie was an adaptation of the epic Mahabharata, fit into a rural scenario and referencing some of the clashes between the Pandavas and the Kauravas.

The film was remade in Telugu as Manavoori Pandavulu (1978) by Bapu who later directed the Hindi remake Hum Paanch (1981) and in Tamil as Pannai Purathu Pandavargal (1982).

Film Companion while compiling the 25 Greatest Telugu Films of the Decade, called Rangasthalam an updated version of Mana Voori Pandavulu which was the Telugu remake of this movie.

Storyline 
The movie is an adaptation of the epic Mahabharata, fit into a rural scenario. It highlights the clash between a village zamindar and five young men, some of them similar to the conflicts between the Pandavas and the Kauravas. Pandavaru refers to the five men.

Cast

Soundtrack

References

External links 
 

1978 films
1970s Kannada-language films
Films directed by Puttanna Kanagal
Kannada films remade in other languages
Films scored by Vijaya Bhaskar
Films based on the Mahabharata